Diwakar Prasad is an Indian former amateur boxer.

He qualified to compete in the bantamweight division (54 kg) at the 2004 Summer Olympics in Athens, Greece after losing in the finals of the 2nd AIBA Asian 2004 Olympic Qualifying Tournament in Karachi, Pakistan to Thailand's Worapoj Petchkoom. In the 2004 Olympics he lost in the second round to Nigeria's Nestor Bolum and came joint 9th.

Other notable achievements include:
 2003 Asian Olympic Qualifier - Bronze
 2003 Commonwealth Boxing Championship - Bronze
 2004 SAFF Games - Bronze
 2006 Grand Prix Boxing - Silver
 2009 56th Senior National Boxing Championship at Hyderabad - Bronze
 2010 Sahara 57th Senior National Boxing C'ship at Talkatora Indoor Stadium - Bronze
 2011 65th All India Inter Railway Men Boxing C'ship at Karnail Stadium - Gold
 2012 Sahara 58th Senior Men National Boxing C'ship at Alagappa Engineering - Gold

References

sports-reference

Living people
Indian male boxers
Bantamweight boxers
Olympic boxers of India
Boxers at the 2004 Summer Olympics
Boxers at the 2006 Commonwealth Games
People from Jamshedpur
Boxers from Jharkhand
Boxers at the 2006 Asian Games
Year of birth missing (living people)
Asian Games competitors for India
Commonwealth Games competitors for India